Dev Jennings may refer to:

 Devereaux Jennings (1924–2000), American alpine skier
 Dev Jennings (cinematographer) (1884–1952), American cinematographer